Partners in Population and Development (PPD) is an intergovernmental initiative created specifically for the purpose of expanding and improving South-to-South collaboration in the fields of reproductive health, population, and development. PPD was launched at the 1994 International Conference on Population and Development (ICPD), when ten developing countries from Asia, Africa and Latin America formed an intergovernmental alliance to help implement the Cairo Program of Action (POA). This POA, endorsed by 179 nations, stresses the need to establish mechanisms to promote development through the sharing of experiences in reproductive health (RH) and family planning (FP) within and among countries and to promote effective partnerships among the governments, Non- Governmental-Organizations (NGOs), research institutions and the private sector.

During the five-year review of the implementation of the POA (“Cairo+5”), representatives at the June 1999 Special Session of the United Nations General Assembly not only documented renewed commitment to the goals of the ICPD, but also encouraged intensified support of South- South Collaboration.

According to their website, the PPD is the "only organization in the world fully dedicated to South-South partnerships."

Mission
PPD an Intergovernmental Alliance of developing countries is committed to improving the quality of life of people through sustained advocacy, capacity building, networking, knowledge sharing and management and transfer of technology in the field of reproductive health, population and development within the framework of South-South Cooperation.

Board Members

References
About PPD
Creation of PPD
Organizational Structure
How to become a PPD Member
Organizational Priority
List of Partners Country Coordinators (PPD focal persons in the Member Countries)
PPD News
PPD Staff
Contact PPD

External links
Partners in Population and Development homepage
List of UN General Assembly Observers [A/INF/61/5]
PPD Africa Regional Office

Population concern organizations
Political geography
World government
United Nations General Assembly observers